This is a list of administrators and governors of Katsina State. 
Katsina State was formed in 1987 when it was split from Kaduna State.

See also
States of Nigeria
List of state governors of Nigeria
Katsina State Executive Council

References

Katsina
Governors